Carline Muir (born 1 October 1987 in Spanish Town, Jamaica) is a Canadian sprinter, who specialized in the 400 metres. She won the bronze medal for the 400 metres, and ultimately, led her national team to claim the sprint relay title at the 2009 Summer Universiade in Belgrade, Serbia. She is also a three-time junior national champion, a two-time silver medalist at the Canadian Track and Field Championships.

Muir made her international debut at the 2005 Pan American Junior Championships in Windsor, Ontario, where she captured the silver medal for the 400 metres, with an impressive time of 52.38 seconds. She also achieved a top-ten finish for the relay team at the 2007 Pan American Games in Rio de Janeiro, Brazil, and had won two individual silver medals at the national trials. In 2008, Muir set her personal best, and attained a B-standard time of 51.77 seconds at the Harry Jerome International Track Classic in Burnaby, British Columbia, which earned her a qualifying spot for the Olympics.

Muir became the youngest track and field athlete to represent Canada at the 2008 Summer Olympics in Beijing, where she competed for the women's 400 metres. She ran in the second heat against six other athletes, including Italy's Libania Grenot and Botswana's promising track star Amantle Montsho. She finished the race in third place by one hundredth of a second ahead of Cuba's Indira Terrero, with her personal best time of 51.55 seconds. Muir advanced into the next round of the competition, as she secured the final mandatory qualifying slot in the second heat. Muir, however, fell short in her bid for the final, as she placed seventh in the semifinal rounds, with her slowest possible time of 52.37 seconds.

At the 2009 Summer Universiade in Belgrade, Serbia, Muir captured the bronze medal in the women's 400 metres, finishing behind her teammate Esther Akinsulie by thirty-seven hundredths of a second (0.37), with a time of 52.07 seconds. She also displayed a spectacular performance by pacing the women's 4×400-metre relay team to a gold medal triumph.

At the 2010 Commonwealth Games in Delhi, India, Muir missed out of the medal podium, as she placed sixth in the final by more than two seconds behind her former rival Montsho in the 400 metres. She initially finished fourth for her national team in the women's 4 × 400 m relay; however, they were immediately upgraded into the bronze medal position, following the disqualification of the Nigerian team.

Muir later emerged as a strong favorite to qualify for her second Olympics in London; however, she missed out of her contention with a third-place finish behind Jenna Martin, who attained a B-standard time of 51.55 seconds, at the Canadian Track and Field Championships in Calgary, Alberta.

Between 2012 and 2014 Muir trained in Florida before moving back to Toronto to train and the Athletics Canada East Hub, where she helped the Canadian 4 × 400 m Women's Relay team finish 7th at the 2015 World Championships and  qualify for the 2016 Rio Olympics.

In 2016 Muir moved to UK based coach Nick Dakin where, along with winning a number European races she broke her 8 year old Personal Best, running 51.05 in Madrid. After winning the Canadian National Championships 400m she was officially named to Canada's Olympic team in the individual Women's 400m and then as part of the 4 × 400 m Women's relay for the second time. The Women's 4 × 400 m finished 4th at the Rio Olympics.

References

External links
 
 
 
 
 
 
 
 

1987 births
Living people
Canadian female sprinters
Athletes from Toronto
Athletes (track and field) at the 2007 Pan American Games
Athletes (track and field) at the 2008 Summer Olympics
Athletes (track and field) at the 2016 Summer Olympics
Athletes (track and field) at the 2010 Commonwealth Games
Black Canadian track and field athletes
Jamaican emigrants to Canada
Naturalized citizens of Canada
Olympic track and field athletes of Canada
World Athletics Championships athletes for Canada
Black Canadian sportswomen
Commonwealth Games bronze medallists for Canada
Commonwealth Games medallists in athletics
Universiade medalists in athletics (track and field)
People from Spanish Town
Universiade gold medalists for Canada
Universiade bronze medalists for Canada
Medalists at the 2009 Summer Universiade
Pan American Games track and field athletes for Canada
Olympic female sprinters
Medallists at the 2010 Commonwealth Games